The 2011 NCAA Division I men's soccer season was the 41st year of college soccer for the Delaware Fightin' Blue Hens men's soccer program. The Blue Hens competed in the Colonial Athletic Association.

The 2011 season was one of the more successful season in the program's history, as the Blue Hens won their first CAA Tournament championship ever, and competed in the NCAA Division I Men's Soccer Championship for the first time since 1970. In the NCAA Tournament, the Blue Hens defeated the Virginia Cavaliers, 1–0, in extra time, to advance to the second round of the tournament. In the second round, the Blue Hens fell to the UCLA Bruins off an 84th-minute goal giving UCLA a 1–0 victory.

Background 

During the 2010 season, the Blue Hens finished fifth in the CAA with a conference record of 5–4–2, and an overall record o

Review

Match results

Legend

Regular season

CAA Tournament

NCAA Tournament

Standings

Team

Roster 

As of October 31, 2011

Statistics

Transfers

In

Out

See also 
Delaware Fightin' Blue Hens
Delaware Fightin' Blue Hens men's soccer
2011 NCAA Division I men's soccer season
2011 Colonial Athletic Association men's soccer season
2011 CAA Men's Soccer Tournament
2011 NCAA Division I Men's Soccer Championship

References 

Delaware Fightin' Blue Hens
Delaware Fightin' Blue Hens, Men
Delaware Fightin' Blue Hens, Men
Fightin' Blue Hens
Soccer in Delaware